The humpback western dogfish (Squalus quasimodo) is a dogfish described in 2016. It is a member of the family Squalidae, found off the coast of Brazil. The length of the longest specimen measured is .This shark got its scientific name from the hump on its back like the fictitious hunchback of Notre Dame, Quasimodo.

References

Squalus
Fish of Brazil
Fish described in 2016